Alligood is a surname. Notable people with the surname include:

Arthur Alligood, American folk singer-songwriter
Bob Alligood (born 1932), American politician
Hannah Alligood (born 2003), American actress